Santa Maria Airport  is the airport serving Santa Maria, Brazil.

It is operated by the Municipality of Santa Maria.

Some of its facilities are shared with the Santa Maria Air Force Base of the Brazilian Air Force.

History
In 1944 the President of Brazil Getúlio Vargas allocated an area of 4 million square meters near Santa Maria with the purpose of building an aerodrome. The works were conducted on an urgent basis, with the collaboration of the United States Army and it was finally opened in April 1945.

Between 1971 and 2015, with the creation of the Santa Maria Air Force Base, civil and military facilities were shared. However, in 2015 an agreement between the Brazilian Air Force and the Municipality of Santa Maria, transferred part of the facilities to the latter. The civil portion of the aerodrome is administrated by the Municipality and the military portion by the Brazilian Air Force.

Airlines and destinations

Access

See also

List of airports in Brazil
Santa Maria Air Force Base

References

External links

Airports in Rio Grande do Sul
Airports established in 1945